Super Match Soccer is an association football video game published by Acclaim Entertainment and developed in 1998 by Jon Ritman. The game was released for PC and PlayStation and it is the last game in the Match Day series.

Gameplay
Super Match Soccer is a 3D video game with five camera angles to see the simulation, each one with four zoom factors. It includes 24 national teams with different skill levels. The player can choose footballers playing in his team and tactic. Names and attributes of each footballer can be edited.

The game can be played against a computer A.I., or other human players. Three or more players are supported using a network connection on PC or a PlayStation Multitap for PlayStation. It also supports analogue controllers for both PC and PlayStation.

Development and release
It was developed as a sequel to Match Day several years after the popular Match Day II. It was presented in a PlayStation preview in Spain as Matchday 3 but due to legal problems it was ultimately released as Super Match Soccer.

The game was exhibited at the September 1997 European Computer Trade Show. At this time, Ocean Software, the owner of the Match Day series, was slated to publish the game.

References

External links 
Game review at computerandvideogames.com
Official home site recovered from archive.org

1998 video games
Association football video games
Video game sequels
Windows games
PlayStation (console) games
Video games developed in the United Kingdom